Sânnicoară may refer to several villages in Romania:

 Sânnicoară, a village in Chiochiș Commune, Bistrița-Năsăud County
 Sânnicoară, a village in Apahida Commune, Cluj County